Acanthocercus guentherpetersi, Peter's ridgeback agama, is a species of lizard in the family Agamidae. It is a small lizard found in Ethiopia.

References

Acanthocercus
Reptiles of Ethiopia
Reptiles described in 2006
Taxa named by Stephen Spawls